YUO may refer to:

 ISO code for Yubanakor dialect of Kwanga language
 ISO 4217 currency code for Yugoslav dinar in 1993

See also
 You (disambiguation)